Uphaz is probably another name for Ophir (Book of Jeremiah 10:9).

Some, however, regard it as the name of an Indian colony in Yemen, southern Arabia; others as a place on or near the river Hyphasis (now the Beas), the south-eastern limit of the Punjab.

Mentions in the Bible

Silver spread into plates is brought from Tarshish, and gold from Uphaz, the work of the workman, and of the hands of the founder: blue and purple is their clothing: they are all the work of cunning men.

Then I lifted up mine eyes, and looked, and behold a certain man clothed in linen, whose loins were girded with fine gold of Uphaz:

References
 

Hebrew Bible places
History of Yemen
Book of Jeremiah
Book of Daniel
Ophir